KLHI-FM (92.5 FM) is a radio station licensed to Kahului, Hawaii, United States, and serving the Maui area.  The station is currently owned by Pacific Radio Group.

History
The station went on the air as KORL-FM on September 12, 2006.  On June 29, 2007, the station changed its call sign to the current KLHI.  On April 30, 2009, the format switched from Alternative to island and reggae, to include native Hawaiian music, and now goes by the name "Native 92.5."

On April 20, 2018, KLHI rebranded as HI92, "Today's Island Hits"; the new format maintains similar content, but with an emphasis towards newer music, as well as reggae.

References

External links
 KLHI-FM online

LHI-FM
Hawaiian-music formatted radio stations
Radio stations established in 2006
Contemporary hit radio stations in the United States